A saltire, also called Saint Andrew's Cross or the crux decussata, is a heraldic symbol in the form of a diagonal cross. The word comes from the Middle French sautoir, Medieval Latin saltatoria ("stirrup").

From its use as field sign, the saltire came to be used in a number of flags, in the 16th century for Scotland and Burgundy, in the 18th century also as the ensign of the Russian Navy, and for Ireland. Notable 19th-century usage includes some of the flags of the Confederate States of America. It is also used in the flag of Jamaica and on seals, and as a heraldic charge in coats of arms.

The term saltirewise or in saltire refers to heraldic charges arranged as a diagonal cross. The shield may also be divided per saltire, i.e. diagonally.

A warning sign in the shape of a saltire is also used to indicate the point at which a railway line intersects a road at a level crossing.

Heraldry and vexillology 
The saltire is important both in heraldry, being found in many coats of arms, and in vexillology, being found as the dominant feature of multiple flags.

The saltire is one of the so-called ordinaries, geometric charges that span throughout (from edge to edge of) the shield. As suggested by the name saltire ("stirrup"; in French: sautoir, in German: Schragen), the ordinary in its early use was not intended as representing a Christian cross symbol. The association with Saint Andrew is a development of the 15th to 16th centuries. The Cross of Burgundy emblem originates in the 15th century, as a field sign, and as the Saint Andrew's Cross of Scotland was used in flags or banners (but not in coats of arms) from the 16th century, and used as naval ensign during the Age of Sail.

When two or more saltires appear, they are usually blazoned as couped (cut off). For example, contrast the single saltire in the arms granted to G. M. W. Anderson—with the three saltires couped in the coat of Kemble Greenwood.

Diminutive forms include the fillet saltire, usually considered half or less the width of the saltire, and the saltorel, a narrow or couped saltire.

A field (party) per saltire is divided into four areas by a saltire-shaped "cut". If two tinctures are specified, the first refers to the areas above (in chief) and below (in base) the crossing, and the second refers to the ones on either side (in the flanks). Otherwise, each of the four divisions may be blazoned separately.

The phrase in saltire or saltirewise is used in two ways:
 Two long narrow charges "in saltire" are placed to cross each other diagonally. Common forms include the crossed keys found in the arms of many entities associated with Saint Peter and paired arrows.
 When five or more compact charges are "in saltire", they are arranged with one in the center and the others along the arms of an invisible saltire.

Division of the field per saltire was notably used by the Aragonese kings of Sicily beginning in the 14th century (Frederick the Simple), showing the pales of Aragon and the "Hohenstaufen" eagle (argent an eagle sable).

Scotland 

The Flag of Scotland, called The Saltire or Saint Andrew's Cross, is a blue field with a white saltire. According to tradition, it represents Saint Andrew, who is supposed to have been crucified on a cross of that form (called a crux decussata) at Patras, Greece.

The Saint Andrew's Cross was worn as a badge on hats in Scotland, on the day of the feast of Saint Andrew.

In the politics of Scotland, both the Scottish National Party and Scottish Conservative Party use stylised saltires as their party logos, deriving from the flag of Scotland.

Prior to the Union the Royal Scots Navy used a red ensign incorporating the St Andrew's Cross; this ensign is now sometimes flown as part of an unofficial civil ensign in Scottish waters. With its colours exchanged (and a lighter blue), the same design forms part of the arms and flag of Nova Scotia (whose name means "New Scotland").

Cross of Burgundy 

The Cross of Burgundy, a form of the Saint Andrew's Cross, is used in numerous flags across Europe and the Americas. It was first used in the 15th century as an emblem by the Valois Dukes of Burgundy. The Duchy of Burgundy, forming a large part of eastern France and the Low Countries, was inherited by the House of Habsburg on the extinction of the Valois ducal line. The emblem was therefore assumed by the monarchs of Spain as a consequence of the Habsburgs bringing together, in the early 16th century, their Burgundian inheritance with the other extensive possessions they inherited throughout Europe and the Americas, including the crowns of Castile and Aragon. As a result, the Cross of Burgundy has appeared in a wide variety of flags connected with territories formerly part of the Burgundian or Habsburg inheritance. Examples of such diversity include the Spanish naval ensign (1506-1701), the flag of Carlism (a nineteenth century Spanish conservative movement), the flag of the Dutch capital of Amsterdam and municipality of Eijsden, the flag of Chuquisaca in Bolivia and the flags of the US states of Florida and Alabama.

Gascony 

Gascony has not had any institutional unity since the 11th century, hence several flags are currently used in the territory. Legend says that this flag appeared in the time of Pope Clement III to gather the Gascons during the Third Crusade (12th century). That flag, sometimes called "Union Gascona" (Gascon Union), contains the St Andrew's cross, the patron saint of Bordeaux and the red color of English kingdom, which reigned over Gascony from 12th to mid-15th century.
In Tome 14 of the Grande Encyclopédie, published in France between 1886 and 1902 by Henri Lamirault, it says 

Maritime flags 

The naval ensign of the Imperial Russian (1696–1917) and Russian navies (1991–present) is a blue saltire on a white field.

The international maritime signal flag for M is a white saltire on a blue background, and indicates a stopped vessel. A red saltire on a white background denotes the letter V and the message "I require assistance".

Others 
The flags of the Colombian archipelago of San Andrés and Providencia and the Spanish island of Tenerife also use a white saltire on a blue field. The Brazilian cities of Rio de Janeiro and Fortaleza also use a blue saltire on a white field, with their coats-of-arms at the hub.

Saltires are also seen in several other flags, including the flags of Grenada, Jamaica, Alabama, Florida, Jersey, Logroño, Vitoria, Amsterdam, Breda, Katwijk, Potchefstroom, The Bierzo and Valdivia, as well as the former Indian princely states of Khairpur, Rajkot and Jaora.

The design is also part of the Confederate Battle Flag and Naval Jack used during the American Civil War (see Flags of the Confederate States of America). Arthur L. Rogers, designer of the final version of the Confederate National flag, claimed that it was based on the saltire of Scotland. The saltire is used on modern-day Southern U.S. state flags to honour the former Confederacy.

Christian symbol 
Anne Roes (1937) identifies a design consisting of two crossing diagonal lines in a rectangle, sometimes with four dots or balls in the four quarters, as an emblem or vexillum (standard) of Persepolis during the 3rd to 2nd centuries BC. Roes also finds the design in Argive vase painting, and still earlier in button seals of the Iranian Chalcolithic. Roes also notes the occurrence of a very similar if not identical vexillum which repeatedly occurs in Gaulish coins of c. the 2nd to 1st century BC, in a recurring design where it is held by a charioteer in front of his human-headed horse. A large number of coins of this type (118 out of 152 items) forms part of the Les Sablons hoard of the 1st century BC, discovered in Le Mans between 1991 and 1997, associated with the Cenomani.
 
The same design is found on coins of Christian Roman emperors of the 4th to 5th centuries (Constantius II, Valentinian, Jovian, Gratianus, Valens, Arcadius, Constantine III, Jovinus, Theodosius I, Eugenius and Theodosius II). The letter Χ (Chi) was from an early time used as a symbol for Christ (unrelated to the Christian cross symbol, which at the time was given a T-shape). The vexillum on imperial coins from the 4th century was sometimes shown as the Labarum, surmounted by or displaying the Chi-Rho monogram rather than just the crux decussata. The emblem of the crux decussata in a rectangle, sometimes with four dots or balls, re-appears in coins the Byzantine Empire, in the 9th to 10th centuries. Roes suggested that early Christians endorsed its solar symbolism as appropriate to Christ.

The association with Saint Andrew develops in the late medieval period. The tradition according to which this saint was crucified on a decussate cross is not found in early hagiography. Depictions of Saint Andrew being crucified in this manner first appear in the 10th century, but do not become standard before the 17th century. Reference to the saltire as "St Andrew's Cross" is made by the Parliament of Scotland (where Andrew had been adopted as patron saint) in 1385, in a decree to the effect that every Scottish and French soldier (fighting against the English under Richard II) "shall have a sign before and behind, namely a white St. Andrew's Cross".

Other 

The diagonal cross (decussate cross) or X mark is called "saltire" in heraldic and vexillological contexts.

A black diagonal cross was used in an old European Union standard as the hazard symbol for irritants (Xi) or harmful chemicals (Xn). It indicated a hazard less severe than skull and crossbones, used for poisons, or the corrosive sign.

The Maria Theresa thaler has a Roman numeral ten to symbolize the 1750 debasement of the coinage, from 9 to 10 thalers to the Vienna mark (a weight of silver).

A diagonal cross known as "crossbuck" is used as the conventional road sign used to indicate the point at which a railway line intersects a road at a level crossing, called a in this context. A white diagonal cross on a blue background (or black on yellow for temporary signs) is displayed in UK railway signalling as a "cancelling indicator" for the Automatic Warning System (AWS), informing the driver that the received warning can be disregarded.

In Cameroon, a red "X" placed on illegally constructed buildings scheduled for demolition is occasionally referred to as a "St Andrew's Cross". It is usually accompanied by the letters "A.D." ("à détruire"—French for "to be demolished") and a date or deadline. During a campaign of urban renewal by the Yaoundé Urban Council in Cameroon, the cross was popularly referred to as "Tsimi's Cross" after the Government Delegate to the council, Gilbert Tsimi Evouna.

In traditional timber framing a pair of crossing braces is sometimes called a saltire or a St. Andrew's Cross. Half-timbering, particularly in France and Germany, has patterns of framing members forming many different symbols known as ornamental bracing.

Gallery

Coats of arms

saltirewise

in supporters

Flags

International Code of Signals

US states

Military insignia

Orders

See also 

 Christian cross
 Cross of Saint Peter
 Crossbuck
 Nordic cross
 Saint George's Cross
 Saint Patrick's Saltire
 X mark

Notes

References

External links

Andrew the Apostle
Christian crosses
Cross symbols
Crosses in heraldry
Flags of saints
Heraldic ordinaries
Saltire flags
Timber framing